KTSP may refer to:

 KTSP, the ICAO code for Tehachapi Municipal Airport, Kern County, California
 Kai Tak Sports Park, an upcoming multi-purpose sports venue in Kai Tak, Hong Kong
 Kennedy Town Swimming Pool, a swimming pool in Kennedy Town, Hong Kong